Dyumeyevo (Dömäy) is a rural locality (a selo) and the administrative centre of Dyumeyevsky Selsoviet, Ilishevsky District, Bashkortostan, Russia. The population was 851 as of 2010. There are 5 streets.

Geography 
Dyumeyevo is located 25 km south of Verkhneyarkeyevo (the district's administrative centre) by road. Baza-Kuyanovo is the nearest rural locality.

References 

Rural localities in Ilishevsky District